The 1936–37 Yugoslav Football Championship (Serbo-Croato-Slovenian: Državno prvenstvo 1936/37 / Државно првенство 1936/37) was the 14th season of Kingdom of Yugoslavia's premier football competition.  It was won by Croatian side Građanski Zagreb.

League

Results

Winning squad
Champions:

Građanski Zagreb (coach: Marton Bukovi)

Emil Urch
Ivan Jazbinšek
Bernard Hügl
Jozo Kovačević
Mirko Kokotović
Svetozar Đanić
August Lešnik
Milan Antolković
Branko Pleše
Ivan Medarić

Top scorers
Final goalscoring position, number of goals, player/players and club.
1 - 21 goals - Blagoje Marjanović (BSK Belgrade)
2 - 14 goals - August Lešnik (Građanski Zagreb)
3 - 13 goals - Aleksandar Petrović (Jugoslavija)

See also
Yugoslav Cup
Yugoslav League Championship
Football Association of Yugoslavia

References

External links
Yugoslavia Domestic Football Full Tables

Yugoslav Football Championship
Yugo
1936–37 in Yugoslav football